Punjab Land Records Authority (reporting name: PLRA) is the Punjab Government's agency that is responsible for land registration. It was established under the administrative control of the Board of Revenue to replace the Patwari culture in Punjab.

References 

Government agencies of Punjab, Pakistan
Land registration